The 1996 ACC Trophy was a cricket tournament in Malaysia, which took place from 6 to 16 September 1996. It gave Associate and Affiliate members of the Asian Cricket Council experience of international one-day cricket and also helped form an essential part of regional rankings. The tournament was won by Bangladesh who defeated the UAE in the final by 108 runs.

Teams
The teams were separated into two groups of six. The following teams took part in the tournament:

Group stages
The top two from each group qualified for the semi-finals.

Group A

Group B

Semi-finals

Final

Statistics

References

External links
CricketArchive tournament page 

1996 in Malaysian sport
International cricket competitions from 1994–95 to 1997
1996
International cricket competitions in Malaysia